Hunches in Bunches is a children's book written and illustrated by Theodor Geisel under the pen name Dr. Seuss and published by Random House on October 12, 1982.

Plot

A boy is approached by numerous strange creatures with enormous gloved hats on their heads. Each "hunch" points out a different possible course of action with each hunch contradicting the others.

References

Books by Dr. Seuss
1982 children's books
Random House books